A Frenchman is a 2019 Russian black-and-white historical drama film directed by Andrey Smirnov.

Plot 
The film takes place in 1957. The film tells about the French student Pierre Durand, who goes to Moscow for an internship, where he gets acquainted with the Bolshoi Theater ballerina and photographer, thanks to whom he immersed himself in the cultural life of Moscow.

Cast 
 Anton Rival as Pierre Durand, French student
 Evgenia Obraztsova as Kira Galkina, ballerina of the Bolshoi Theater
 Yevgeny Tkachuk as Valery "Valera" Uspensky, photographer
 Aleksandr Baluev as Tatishchev
 Mikhail Efremov as Valery Uspensky's dad
 Roman Madyanov as Chuhnovsky
 Nina Drobysheva as Olga Obrezkova
 Natalya Tenyakova as Maria Obrezkova
 Thomas Alden as Louis
 Anna Neverova as Marusya
 Alexander Zamuraev as Alcoholic 
 Manuel Sinor as Restaurateur

Awards 
A Frenchman won the Nika Award for Best Feature Film and Best Director, along with other awards.

References

External links 
 

2019 films
2010s historical drama films
2010s Russian-language films
Russian black-and-white films
Russian historical drama films
2019 drama films